Estonia participated in the Eurovision Song Contest 2005 with the song "Let's Get Loud" written by Sven Lõhmus. The song was performed by the group Suntribe. The Estonian broadcaster Eesti Televisioon (ETV) organised the national final Eurolaul 2005 in order to select the Estonian entry for the 2005 contest in Kyiv, Ukraine. Nine songs competed in the national final and "Let's Get Loud" performed by Suntribe was selected as the winner entirely by a public vote.

Estonia competed in the semi-final of the Eurovision Song Contest which took place on 19 May 2005. Performing during the show in position 12, "Let's Get Loud" was not announced among the top 10 entries of the semi-final and therefore did not qualify to compete in the final. It was later revealed that Estonia placed twentieth out of the 25 participating countries in the semi-final with 31 points.

Background 

In 2004, "Tii" performed by Neiokõsõ failed to qualify Estonia to the final where the song placed eleventh in the semi-final.

The Estonian national broadcaster, Eesti Televisioon (ETV), broadcasts the event within Estonia and organises the selection process for the nation's entry. Since their debut, the Estonian broadcaster has organised national finals that feature a competition among multiple artists and songs in order to select Estonia's entry for the Eurovision Song Contest. The Eurolaul competition has been organised since 1996 in order to select Estonia's entry and on 13 October 2004, ETV announced the organisation of Eurolaul 2005 in order to select the nation's 2005 entry.

Before Eurovision

Eurolaul 2005 
Eurolaul 2005 was the twelfth edition of the Estonian national selection Eurolaul, which selected Estonia's entry for the Eurovision Song Contest 2005. The competition consisted of a ten-song final on 5 February 2005 at the ETV studios in Tallinn, hosted by Marko Reikop and Eda-Ines Etti and broadcast on ETV.

Competing entries 
On 13 October 2004, ETV opened the submission period for artists and composers to submit their entries up until 6 December 2004. All artists and composers were required to have Estonian citizenship or be a permanent resident of Estonia. 92 submissions were received by the deadline. A 10-member jury panel selected 10 finalists from the submissions and the selected songs were announced on 9 December 2004. The selection jury consisted of Jaak Joala (musician), Priit Hõbemägi (culture critic), Meelis Kapstas (journalist), Jaan Elgula (musician), Allan Roosileht (Star FM presenter), Olavi Pihlamägi (journalist), Maarja-Liis Ilus (singer), Hanna-Liina Võsa (singer), Urmas Lattikas (composer) and Jaagup Kreem (musician).

Airi Ojamets and Cardinals have both competed in previous editions of Eurolaul. On 15 December 2004, "Set Me as a Seal", written by Bard Eirik Hallesby Norheim and Jo Hegle Sjaeflot and to have been performed by Bard Eirik Hallesby Norheim, was disqualified from the competition due to the song being co-written by a non-Estonian citizen and replaced with the song "Have You Ever" performed by Rebecca Kontus.

Final 
The final took place on 5 February 2005. Nine songs competed during the show, following the disqualification of "Nevermore Island" performed by Julia Boman on 2 February 2005 due to the song being published in December 2003, and "Let's Get Loud" performed by Suntribe was selected as the winner entirely by a public televote which registered 44,409 votes.

At Eurovision
According to Eurovision rules, all nations with the exceptions of the host country, the "Big Four" (France, Germany, Spain and the United Kingdom) and the ten highest placed finishers in the 2004 contest are required to qualify from the semi-final on 19 May 2005 in order to compete for the final on 21 May 2005; the top ten countries from the semi-final progress to the final. On 22 March 2005, a special allocation draw was held which determined the running order for the semi-final and Estonia was set to perform in position 12, following the entry from Belgium and before the entry from Norway. On 3 March 2005, Daana Otsa was announced to have joined the group as a fifth member. At the end of the semi-final, Estonia was not announced among the top 10 entries in the semi-final and therefore failed to qualify to compete in the final. It was later revealed that Estonia placed 20th in the semi-final, receiving a total of 31 points.

The semi-final and the final were broadcast in Estonia on ETV with commentary by Marko Reikop. The Estonian spokesperson, who announced the Estonian votes during the final, was Maarja-Liis Ilus who had previously represented Estonia in the Eurovision Song Contest in 1996 and 1997.

Voting 
Below is a breakdown of points awarded to Estonia and awarded by Estonia in the semi-final and grand final of the contest. The nation awarded its 12 points to Switzerland in the semi-final and the final of the contest.

Points awarded to Estonia

Points awarded by Estonia

References

2005
Countries in the Eurovision Song Contest 2005
Eurovision